Charonne Mose is a Canadian Emmy Award winning Choreographer, Webby Award winning Creative Director and dancer, who now resides in Washington, DC.

Early years
Charonne was born in Toronto, Ontario, Canada, the middle of three daughters to Dr. Kenrick Mose and Charmion Mose, both originally from Trinidad and Tobago. Charonne went on to earn a degree from the Fashion Institute of Technology, where she graduated magna cum laude. After working in the fashion industry for two years, Charonne decided to seriously pursue a dance career and eventually moved to Los Angeles. She has danced and choreographed in New York, Europe and Los Angeles.

Career
Charonne's choreography career grew after working with choreographer and producer Anita Mann in the early nineties. Charonne choreographed numerous television shows, films, videos, commercials and live events over the next fifteen years. Charonne worked with many Hollywood legends like Shari Lewis, Whoopi Goldberg, Jerry Lewis,   Harry Connick Jr., and Mary J. Blige. In 1996, Charonne Mose and Anita Mann won the Emmy Award for Outstanding Choreography for the 1995 Miss America Pageant, winning above Travis Payne and LaVelle Smith, who choreographed Michael Jackson in the MTV Video Music Awards.

After a long rewarding career in dance and choreography and the birth of her daughter, Charonne decided to go back to school and study Interactive Media. She then went on to earn a Bachelor of Science Degree in Business graduating on the President's List. After working at Disney for 6 years, 20th Century Fox, and Guitar Center heading the UX Design department, Charonne moved to Washington D.C. where she is a Principal Program Manager at Microsoft  and is finishing her Masters in Competitive Business Intelligence at Georgetown University.

Partial filmography
As choreographer

Television
 Harry Connick Jr. Christmas Special (1994)
 27th Annual Country Music Association Awards (1994)
 1995 Miss America Pageant (1996)
 Muppets Tonight (1996)
 77th Annual Miss America Pageant (1998)
 25th Annual American Music Awards (1998)
 Quincy Jones -- The First 50 Years (1998) (as consultant)
 34th Annual Academy of Country Music Awards (1999)

Film
 Sing (1989)

Awards and honors
In 1995, Charonne Mose won an Emmy Award for Outstanding Choreography for the Miss America Pageant.  She has also won an Addy Award from the American Advertising Association and a Webby Award for her work in interactive design.

References

External links
 

Canadian choreographers
Living people
Fashion Institute of Technology alumni
People from Toronto
Year of birth missing (living people)
Canadian women choreographers